"The Creeps" is a song written, performed and produced (with Per Ebdrup) by Camille Jones, released in 2005 and remixed in 2007 by Fedde Le Grand. The song was the first single of Camille's 2004 album Surrender. Dutch DJ-producer Fedde Le Grand signed the song to his own burgeoning Flamingo Recordings imprint and produced a house remix. In early 2007, the remix had been picked up by radio stations in the UK and all over Europe before it was released on Ministry of Sound on 5 March 2007 in the UK and Ireland. The remix became a hit on the charts and the clubs as well. In the UK, "The Creeps" reached #7 on the Singles Chart and #1 on the Dance Chart. On 25 July 2008, "The Creeps" was released as a physical and download single in Germany through Kontor Records Hamburg. The remix from 2007 was remastered slightly, with new instruments on the chorus, which resemble the trumpets on Fedde Le Grand's remix of "Let Me Think About It" by Ida Corr.

Music video

There are four official music videos to the song The Creeps. The first video (for the 2005 single) was produced by Mikkel Serup and received a nomination for a Danish Music Award in 2005. In 2006 the same video was released on the Spanish distributor Blanco y Negro, but with the Original Club version as background music. The second music video was directed by Marcus Adams and was recorded in an office with dancers/models performing as secretaries, among them Lauren Ridealgh, Stephanie Fitzpatrick and Emma Warton, with choreography by Paul Roberts. The video was inspired by the music video to "Express Yourself" and the movie Secretary. In July 2008, a new edited version of the second video had been released to German Channels, which contained also a new 2008 version of the remix.

Charts
The 2007 remix by Fedde Le Grand peaked at #7 on the UK singles chart.

Weekly charts

Year-end charts

On 25 July 2008, the single was released as a physical CD, which reached #82 in the Main German Single Charts Top 100 (as of 8 August 2008).

The Creeps (2019 remixes)

In 2019 Spinnin' Records launched a package containing remixes by Bingo Players, Nonsens and JS16.

References

External links
 first music video (Original Club Edited)
 second music video (Fedde Le Grand Remix) at Ministry of Sound
 Behind the Scenes clip at Ministry of Sound

2005 singles
2005 songs
Tommy Boy Records singles